Emanuel Taffertshofer (born 24 February 1995) is a German professional footballer who plays as a midfielder for SV Wehen Wiesbaden.

Career
Taffertshofer is a youth exponent from TSV 1860 Munich, who mainly plays for the second team in the Regionalliga Bayern. He gave his debut for the first team in a 1–0 home defeat against Karlsruhe on 19 October 2015.

Personal life
Taffertshofer's older brother Ulrich is a youth exponent from 1860 Munich as well and plays currently for fellow 3. Liga side VfL Osnabrück.

Career statistics

References

1995 births
Living people
People from Landsberg am Lech
Sportspeople from Upper Bavaria
Footballers from Bavaria
German footballers
Association football midfielders
2. Bundesliga players
3. Liga players
TSV 1860 Munich II players
TSV 1860 Munich players
Würzburger Kickers players
SV Sandhausen players
SV Wehen Wiesbaden players